Jerry Tuckwin is an American football coach.  Tuckwin was the head football coach for the Haskell Indian Nations University in Lawrence, Kansas for the 2000 season.  His coaching record at Haskell Indian Nations was 2–8.

References

Year of birth missing (living people)
Living people
Haskell Indian Nations Fighting Indians football coaches